Rodney Needham (15 May 1923 – 4 December 2006 in Oxford) was an English social anthropologist.

Born Rodney Phillip Needham Green, he changed his name in 1947; the following year he married Maud Claudia (Ruth) Brysz. The couple would collaborate on several works, including an English translation of Robert Hertz's Death and the Right Hand.

His fieldwork was with the Penan of Borneo (1951-2) and the Siwang of Malaysia (1953-5). His doctoral thesis on the Penan was accepted in 1953. He was University Lecturer in Social Anthropology, Oxford University, 1956–76; Professor of Social Anthropology, Oxford, 1976–90; Official Fellow, Merton College, Oxford, 1971–75; and Fellow, All Souls College, Oxford, 1976-90.

Together with Edmund Leach and Mary Douglas, Needham brought structuralism from France and anglicised it in the process. A prolific scholar, he was also a teacher and a rediscoverer of neglected figures in the history of his discipline, such as Arnold Van Gennep and Robert Hertz.

Among other things, he contributed to the study of family resemblance, introducing the terms "monothetic" and "polythetic" into anthropology.

He had two children, one of whom, Tristan, became a professor of mathematics.

Bibliography
1962 Structure and sentiment
1971 Rethinking kinship and marriage
1972 Belief, language and experience
1973 Right and left. Essays on dual symbolic classification
1974 Remarks and inventions – Skeptical essays about kinship
1975 Polythetic classification: Convergence and consequences
1978 Primordial characters
1978 Essential perplexities
1979 Symbolic classification
1980 Reconnaissances, U. of Toronto Press, 
1981 Circumstantial deliveries, Berkeley: University of California Press, 
1983 Against the tranquility of axioms
1983 Sumba and the slave trade 
1985 Exemplars, Berkeley: University of California Press,  
1987 Counterpoints
1987 Mamboru, history and structure in a domain of Northwestern Sumba

References

External links
 Filmed in Canberra in 1979 by Timothy Asch, in conversation with James J. Fox.
Obituaries: 
The Guardian
The Telegraph
The Independent
The Times
 Full text of doctoral thesis, "The social organisation of the Penan" via Oxford Research Archive

1923 births
2006 deaths
English anthropologists
Social anthropologists
Center for Advanced Study in the Behavioral Sciences fellows
Alumni of Merton College, Oxford